In ancient Japan, the saotome (“early maiden” 早乙女) were unmarried girls tasked with planting rice in paddies

Saotome is also a Japanese family name. It may refer to:

People 
 Mitsugi Saotome, aikido master instructor
 Taichi Saotome, traditional Japanese stage actor
, Japanese actor

Fictional characters 
 Ako Saotome from Aikatsu Stars!
 Alto Saotome from Macross Frontier
 Genma Saotome, Ranma Saotome and Nodoka Saotome from Ranma ½
 Haruna Saotome from Negima! Magister Negi Magi
 Yae Saotome from Saotome Senshu, Hitakakusu
 Jin Saotome from Capcom's "Cyberbots" game
 Junko Saotome, a supporting character from the manga series NANA
 Makoto Saotome from Kannazuki no Miko
 Mary Saotome from Kakegurui
 Mondonosuke Saotome a.k.a. Bored Hatamoto from the series of movies starring Utaemon Ichikawa
 Otome Saotome from Shimoneta
 Rei Saotome from Yu-Gi-Oh! GX

See also
Saotomea, a genus of sea snails
São Tomé (disambiguation)

Japanese-language surnames